Stenidea simplex is a species of beetle in the family Cerambycidae. It was described by Fåhraeus in 1872, originally under the genus Amblesthidus. It is known from Ethiopia, Malawi, Kenya, South Africa, Mozambique, and Zimbabwe.

References

simplex
Beetles described in 1872